Chibuzor Oji, better known by his stage name Faze, is a Nigerian musician and actor. He was a member of the defunct Nigerian hip hop group Plantashun Boyz, along with BlackFace Naija and 2face Idibia. The group split up in 2004 and each member of the group has gone on to launch solo careers.

His first album Faze Alone sold over three million copies, while his second album Independent has sold over 7 million copies. His third album Originality went platinum in its first month of release. He is the first Nigerian artist to have three consecutive platinum albums. His collaborations include a recorded single with Wyclef Jean titled "Proud to Be African".

In 2011, Faze made his acting debut starring in the lead male role of Lovechild in the critically acclaimed Nigerian movie Alero's Symphony. He also provided the movie's soundtrack for which he won an Africa Movie Academy Award in 2012, in the category of Achievement in Soundtrack.

Early life
Chibuzor Oji was born in 1977 in Festac Town, Lagos. Oji is the fourth of a large family of nine children. All family members are said to possess good singing vocals perfected by the long time spent singing praises during prayers.

Oji made his first attempt to gain publicity when he won the 1994 DBN Karaoke contest. He performed as a rap musician under the name Lyrical Orge until he joined the Plantashun Boiz.
Faze released his first solo effort titled "Faze Alone" in the last quarter of 2004. Hit songs "Faze Alone", "Angel Gabriella", "Miss U" and "Na True" reached top spots on various music charts.
His brand of music called universal flavor – a fine blend of R&B, Reggae, Pop, Dancehall, Ragga and Soul, all with an African undertone was further popularized by the release of the album.

In 2006 Faze released his sophomore album "Independent". 2008 saw the release of the third studio album from Faze. The lead single "Originality" doubled as the title of the album. Other hits off the album were "Am In Love" and "Spend My Money".
In 2012, Faze went further to work on and release a fourth album "REFAZED". The lead single off the album "Am In The Mood" enjoyed high rotation across radio and TV stations.

In 2013 he added 2 more single hits "Ifeoma" and "Lambo" to his resume, the singer followed up the single releases with videos to each song simultaneously. Faze has performed alongside foreign stars with international credibility like Beenie Man, Wyclef Jean, with whom he also recorded the song "Proud To Be African", and also Akon.

Faze through his music has supported globally acknowledged and respected business brands like Star on the annual Star Trek Event, Globacom on the National Globacom Campus Storm, Guinness on the Guinness Extra Smooth Discovery Shows, and Sprite on their talent grooming event for youths, Spriteball.

Plantashun Boyz

Upon joining Plantashun Boyz as a trio with BlackFace Naija and Tuface (2face Idibia), he changed his stage name to Faze. The band released two albums in the process: Body and Soul in 2000 and Sold Out in 2003. The period was marred by a developing beef about "Faze versus 2Face" in the band that led to the eventual break-up of the band in 2004. The band reunited in 2007 just for one more album Plan B' managed by Plantashun Entertainment management which was formed by Tuface’s former manager Nathaniel Akinwale Owoyemi and his brother and manager Ifeanyi Oji'.

In 2014, Independent Entertainment partners with Valanchy Records under the new Plantashun Management  and they have been in the works. 

Solo career
After the split of the Plantashun Boyz in 2004, Faze signed to Solomon Arueya's  Westside Music Label  of Lagos, Nigeria, to produce his first solo album titled Faze Alone. The album achieved platinum status with sales of 1.2 million units in its first month. The single "Faze Alone" did enormously well on Nigerian music charts, reaching number 1 on music charts of notable radio stations like Rhythm FM, Cool FM, and Ray Power FM. The singles "Miss U" and "Angel Gabriella" from the Faze Alone album were also well received. The album introduced Faze's signature vocals including his ability to sing the highest note by a male in the Nigerian music industry. In 2006 he won the Hip-Hop World award for Best Vocalist. He releases his material through the record label he owns, Independent Entertainment.

On his second album titled 'Independent', released in 2006 he delivered hits such as Kpo Kpo Di Kpo, Letter to my Brother, Tattoo Girls, Need Somebody and Kolomental. Kolomental would go an to become an anthem in clubs and parties all over Nigeria.

He went on a creative hiatus for a few years during which he disappeared from the music scene. The reason for this hiatus was, in his own words, " to study the type of sound being made everywhere so I can fix myself in it without deviating from my real self. That’s just it."

In August 2014, Faze made a comeback with the release of his single ‘Your Daughter’ which received massisve air play. He went on to release another song called ‘Tonite’ with Nigerian dancehall artiste Patoranking.

Trivia
 Terry G aka the Akpako master was a back-up singer for Faze. 
 In May 2011 Busta Rhymes stated that Faze is his favourite Afro-hiphop artist.
 Faze is one of Nigeria's marijuana-free artists.

Discography

Songs
As lead artist

Solo albums
 Faze Alone (2004)
 Independent (2006)
 Originality (2008)
 ReFAZEd (2012)

With Plantashun Boyz
 Body and Soul (2000)
 Body and soul Volume II
 Sold Out (2003)
 Plan B (2007)

Compilation
 Bad Sharp Guys with various artists Vol.1 (2008)
 Bad Sharp Guys with various artists Vol.2 (2010)

Other albums
 Untitled with Ruggedman (2004) (Shelved)

Filmography

Awards and nominations

Nominations in music
MOBO Awards- Best African Act- Independent (2008)
Channel O Awards – Best Newcomer Video – Kolomental (2007)
Channel O Awards- Best West African Video- Loving you Everyday (2008)
Hip-Hop World Awards- Best R&B/Pop Album of the Year- Independent (2008)
Hip-Hop World Awards- Best Song of the Year- Kolomental (2008)
Hip-Hop World Awards- Best Album of the Year- Independent (2008)
Hip-Hop World Awards- Recording of the Year- Need Somebody (2008)
Hip-Hop World Awards- Best Vocal Performance- Someone like me (2008)
Nigeria Music Video Awards- I'm in love (2009)
AMEN Awards- Most Popular Song- Kolomental (2007)
AMEN Awards- Best Male Vocalist (2007)
AMEN Awards- Best R&B Male Vocal Performance (2007)
AMEN Awards- Best R&B Album- Independent (2007)
AMEN Awards- Best Song of the Year- Kolomental (2007)
AMEN Awards- Best Album of the Year- Independent (2007)
AMEN Awards- Best Act of the Year (2007)
Soundcity Awards- Best Male Video of the Year-Kolomental (2008)
Soundcity Awards- Best Direction Video of the Year- Kolomental (2008)
Soundcity Awards- Best Video of the Year- Tattoo Girls (2008)
Soundcity Awards- Best Choreography of the Year -Kpo Kpo Di Kpo (2008)
Soundcity Awards- Best R&B Video of the Year- Need Somebody (2008)
Nigeria Entertainment Awards- Best male vocalist (2006)
Nigeria Entertainment Awards- Best R&B Album of the Year (2007)
Futures Awards- Best Artistes of the year (2008)
8 Fame Music Awards- Best Male Act (2006)

Won
AMAA Awards – Achievement in Soundtrack (2012)
SoundCity Awards- Best Choreography Video- Kpo Kpo Di Kpo (2008)
Hip-Hop World Awards- Best Vocalist of the year (2006)
Criteria Magazine Awards- Youth motivator(2009)

Nominations in film
Africa Movie Academy Awards (AMAA) – Achievement in Soundtrack (Alero's Symphony) (2012)

Won
Africa Movie Academy Awards (AMAA) – Achievement in Soundtrack (Alero's Symphony'') (2012)

References

Faze- Originality album "Stepping up the game", Vanguard News. Retrieved 28 September 2008.
Lolade Sowoolu'Faze Premiere's Originality', Vanguard News. Retrieved 12 September 2008.
Faze- King of R&B tops charts again with Originality, Vanguard News. Retrieved 13 December 2008.
Interview with Faze, Sun newspapers. Retrieved 31 December 2003 
Faze Biography, Retrieved in May 2005

External links
Faze Naijapals
Official Instagram
BBC biography
Faze biography

Igbo musicians
Nigerian songwriters
Igbo rhythm and blues musicians
Nigerian rhythm and blues musicians
Living people
21st-century Nigerian musicians
Nigerian hip hop singers
Male actors from Delta State
Musicians from Delta State
Nigerian reggae musicians
Nigerian music industry executives
The Headies winners
Year of birth missing (living people)